The Apostolic Vicariate of Donkorkrom is a Latin Catholic missionary pre-diocesan jurisdiction in Eastern Ghana.

It is exempt, i.e. directly dependent on the Holy See, not part of any ecclesiastical province.
Its cathedral episcopal see is the Saint Francis Xavier cathedral in Donkorkrom, Ghana.

History 
Established on 2007.06.12 as Apostolic Prefecture of Donkorkrom on territory split off from the Roman Catholic Diocese of Koforidua.

Promoted on 2010.01.19 as Apostolic Vicariate of Donkorkrom, hence entitled to a titular bishop.

Ordinaries 
(all Latin Church)

Apostolic Prefect of Donkorkrom 
 Father Gabriel Edoe Kumordji, Divine Word Missionaries (S.V.D.) (2007.06.12 – 2010.01.19 see below)

Apostolic Vicars of Donkorkrom 
 Gabriel Edoe Kumordji, S.V.D. (see above 2010.01.19 – 2017.03.16), Titular Bishop of Ita (2010.01.19 – 2017.03.16), appointed Bishop of Keta-Akatsi
John Alphonse Asiedu, S.V.D. (2019.05.04 -)

See also 
Roman Catholicism in Ghana

References

External links 
 GCatholic 

2007 establishments in Ghana
Apostolic vicariates
Roman Catholic dioceses in Ghana